This is a list of notable Belgian-Americans. However, the term Belgian-American is here used in a very liberal way: It includes not only Americans of Belgian descent and Belgians who took American citizenship (Belgian-Americans in the strictest sense), but also Americans born in Belgium, Belgians born in the USA, Belgians who lived for a considerable period of time in the United States and vice versa. All, however, would describe themselves as Belgian-Americans.
A brief bio beside each entry helps to clarify in which of these categories each individual falls.

To be included in this list, the person must have a Wikipedia article showing they are Belgian  American or must have references showing they are Belgian American and are notable.

Artists 
Ted LeFevre (1964–), theatrical set designer
Jan Yoors (1922–1977), Flemish-American artist, photographer, painter, sculptor, writer, tapestry creator, and, earlier in life, a gypsy

Builders 
George Washington Goethals (1858–1928), was the Brooklyn-born son of Belgian immigrants. Goethals was the first recorded Belgian-American graduate of West Point (where he is buried) and was appointed by Theodore Roosevelt to build the Panama Canal, which he accomplished under budget in 1914.

Business people 
Henry Ford (1863–1947), mother was an orphan born to Belgian immigrants  adopted by Irish-American neighbors
Carl Karcher, founder of the Carl's Jr. hamburger chain
Maurice Tempelsman (1929–), born in Antwerp; his family moved to New York City in 1940 to escape persecution by Nazi Germany during World War II; a diamond merchant who was the longtime companion to Jacqueline Kennedy Onassis, former First Lady of the United States
 William vanden Heuvel (1930–2021), businessman and diplomat

Entertainers 
 Johnny Crawford (1946–2021), actor; maternal grandparents were Belgian
 Robert L. Crawford Jr. (1944–), actor; maternal grandparents were Belgian
 Cameron Douglas (1978–), actor; father of partial Belgian descent and son of Michael Douglas
 Michael Douglas (1944–), actor and producer; mother of partial Belgian descent
 Robert Duvall (1931–), actor and filmmaker
 Jorja Fox (1968–), actress
 Marianne Hagan (1966–), actress
 Henry Hathaway (1898–1985), film director and producer; born Henri Léopold de Fiennes; by right a Belgian marquis, a hereditary title held by his paternal grandfather, who had been charged by his King Leopold I of Belgium to acquire the Sandwich (Hawaiian) Islands for Belgium; failing to do so, he settled in San Francisco instead of returning home.
 David Hayter (1969–), actor and voice actor
 Bonnie Hunt (1961–), actress and voice actress
 JAF (1930–2005), cartoonist
 Simon Nuchtern (1936–), filmmaker
 America Olivo (1978–), actress, singer, and model; mother of partial Belgian descent
 Frank Oz (1944–), actor, puppeteer, director, and producer; Belgian mother
 Audrina Patridge (1985–), actress, model
 Ben Pronsky (1978–), actor and voice actor
 Drew Van Acker (1986–), actor
 Chiara Aurelia (2002–), actress, Belgian father

Fashion 
 Liz Claiborne (1929–2007), Belgian-born fashion designer
 Diane von Fürstenberg (1946–), Belgian fashion designer based in New York

Inventors 
 Leo Hendrik Baekeland (1863–1944), Belgium-born American chemist who invented Velox photographic paper (1893) and Bakelite (1907), an inexpensive, nonflammable, versatile, and popular plastic; in 1978, he was inducted into the National Inventors Hall of Fame.
 Charles Joseph Van Depoele (1846–1892), electrical engineer, inventor, and pioneer in electric railway technology

Journalists 

Kate Bolduan (July 28, 1983–), television Journalist and News Anchor for CNN

Musicians 
Dirk Verbeuren (1975–), Belgian-born drummer
 Evelyne Brancart (1954–), Belgian-born pianist
 Pierre D'Archambeau (1927–2014), Swiss-born violinist; Belgian parents
 Désiré Defauw (1885–1960), Belgian-born violinist and conductor. He made his American debut with the NBC Symphony Orchestra. Since 1940, Defauw was director and conductor of the Orchestra of the Symphonic Concerts of Montreal. During the following years he conducted the major American Orchestras: the Boston Symphony, Detroit Symphony, with the Chicago Symphony he was Musical Director and Conductor for four years. The Grand Rapids Symphony, and the Chicago Youth Orchestra, he was visiting conductor of orchestral activities at Northwestern University in 1955. Just before his death, he retired as director of the Gary Symphony Orchestra in Indiana.
Frédérique Petrides née Frédérique Mayer (26 September 1903, Antwerp, Belgium–12 January 1983, Manhattan), Belgian-American conductor. In New York City, Petrides founded the Orchestrette Classique, an all-women's chamber orchestra, which existed from 1932 to 1943, premiered works by new American composers, such as Paul Creston, Samuel Barber and David Diamond; and gave five to six concerts annually in Carnegie Chamber Music Hall, now Weill Recital Hall; founded the Carl Schurz Park concert series on Manhattan's Upper East Side in 1958; founded the West Side Orchestral Concerts in 1962; founded the Hudson Valley Symphony Orchestra in Tarrytown, New York in the 1930s, and founded the Student Symphony Society in New York City in 1950. Ms. Petrides was also editor and publisher of the ground-breaking Women in Music newsletters, which, in the 1930s chronicled the activities of women musicians from the ancient Egyptian times to the then present and were published in New York and circulated internationally. Petrides's accomplishments were followed and reviewed by leading critics and writers such as Virgil Thomson,  H. Howard Taubman,  Irving Kolodin, Olin Downes, Robert A. Simon, Jerome D. Bohm, Francis D. Perkins, Theodore Strongin, Raymond Ericson, Harold C. Schonberg and Robert Sherman who, in the New York Times of July 3, 1970, describes Petrides as "a prime mover in New York's cultural affairs since the mid-1930s".
 Jean-Baptiste "Toots" Thielemans (1922–2016), Belgian jazz artist well known for his guitar, harmonica play and also for his highly accomplished professional whistling. He made his big breakthrough when he went on European tour with Benny Goodman in 1950. He moved to America in 1952 (and became a US citizen the same year) where he is extremely well known, especially among the jazz community. Quincy Jones said this about him in 1995 : "I can say without hesitation that Toots is one of the greatest musicians of our time. On his instrument he ranks with the best that jazz has ever produced. He goes for the heart and makes you cry. We have worked together more times than I can count and he always keeps me coming back for more". Toots hates his favourite instrument, the harmonica, being called a 'miscellaneous instrument'. Indeed, the late Clifford Brown said : "Toots, the way you play the harmonica they should not call it a miscellaneous instrument".His successes include harmonica solo contributions to film scores for Midnight Cowboy, The Getaway, Sugarland Express, Cinderella Liberty, Turks Fruit (Turkish Delight), Jean de Florette and others. In 1962, he had a massive hit with 'Bluesette'. He also did many concerts and recordings with legends such as George Shearing, Ella Fitzgerald, Quincy Jones, Bill Evans, Jaco Pastorius, Natalie Cole, Pat Metheny, Paul Simon and Billy Joel. Many people also will remember him from the music used for the 'Old Spice' TV commercial.

Politicians 
 Bob Beauprez (1948–), member of the United States House of Representatives
 Charles Benedict Calvert (1808–1864), U.S. Congressman from the sixth district of Maryland, serving one term, 1861—1863; his mother, Rosalie Eugenia Stier, was the daughter of a wealthy Belgian aristocrat, Baron Henri Joseph Stier (1743–1821) and his wife Marie Louise Peeters
 James Carville (1944–), lawyer
 Blake Farenthold (1961–), politician and lobbyist
 Peter Minuit (1589–1638), Belgium-born in the Duchy of Cleves, in present-day Germany; Director-General of the Dutch colony of New Netherland from 1626 until 1633 and founder of the Swedish colony of New Sweden in 1638; by tradition he purchased the island of Manhattan from the Native Americans (Algonquins), on May 24, 1626
 Louis C. Rabaut (1886–1961), Democratic congressman representing Michigan's 14th congressional district
 Francis Rombouts (1631–1691), Mayor of New York City
 Anne-Marie Slaughter (1958–), Director of Policy Planning for the United States Department of State. She was Dean of the Woodrow Wilson School of Public and International Affairs at Princeton University from 2002 to 2009. Slaughter was raised in Charlottesville, Virginia by her American father and Belgian mother. She graduated magna cum laude from Princeton in 1980 where she majored in the Woodrow Wilson School and received a certificate in European cultural studies. She received her M.Phil. and D.Phil. degrees in international relations from Oxford in 1982 and 1992, respectively, and her law degree from Harvard Law School, cum laude, in 1985.
 Leon L. Van Autreve (1920–2002), Sergeant Major of the Army

Prelates 
 Father Pierre-Jean DeSmet (1801–1873), Belgian-born Roman Catholic priest who became the most trusted of the white men among the Native Americans of the Western United States in the mid-19th century
 Louis Hennepin, baptized Father Antoine (1626 – c. 1705), Flemish Catholic priest and missionary of the Franciscan Recollect Order (French: Récollets) and an explorer of the interior of North America; discovered Niagara Falls, Hannibal, Missouri and was the first to place the name 'Chicago' on a map (1683)
 Archbishop Charles John Seghers, the Apostle of Alaska (1839–1886) was consecrated Bishop of Vancouver Island on June 29, 1873. On November 28, 1886, while resting in a deserted cabin in the Alaskan foothills, Bishop Seghers was shot through the heart.  His body was borne back to a grief-stricken people and his remains rest under the high altar in the Cathedral at Victoria.
 James Oliver Van de Velde (1795–1855), Belgian-born US Catholic bishop;  served as the second Roman Catholic Bishop of Chicago, 1849-1853; in 1853, he was transferred to Natchez, Mississippi and became bishop of the Diocese of Natchez, where he served until his death
 Adrien-Joseph Croquet, born in Braine l'Alleud ; sent in 1859 to Oregon ; 1860-1898: recorded tribal births, deaths, and confirmations at the Grand Ronde Reservation. His work constitutes the most complete genealogical record
 Henry Gabriels (1838–1921), Belgian-born second Catholic bishop of Ogdensburg, New York (1891 - 1921). Gabriels Sanatorium opened in 1897, for treatment of Tuberculosis invalids in the Adirondacks. It was named in honor of the Right Rev. Bishop Henry Gabriëls who had urged the Sisters of Mercy to attempt the establishment. It was the first sanatorium in the Adirondacks to admit black patients
 Augustin Van de Vyver (1844–1911), Belgian-born sixth Catholic bishop of Richmond, Virginia (1889 - 1911)

Scholars
 Francis Deblauwe (1961-), Belgian-American Mesopotamian archaeologist and culture-heritage expert known for the Iraq War & Archaeology project
 George Sarton (1884–1956), seminal Belgian-American polymath and historian of science; father of May Sarton
 Robert Triffin (1911–1993), Belgian-born economist best known for his critique of the Bretton Woods system, later known as Triffin's Dilemma
 Marc Van de Mieroop (1956-), Belgian-American Assyriologist
 Gonda Van Steen (1964–), Belgian-American classical scholar and linguist

Scientists 
 Leo Hendrik Baekeland (1863–1944), Belgium-born American chemist who invented Velox photographic paper (1893) and Bakelite (1907), an inexpensive, nonflammable, versatile, and popular plastic; in 1978, he was inducted into the National Inventors Hall of Fame
 Maurice Anthony Biot (1905–1985), Belgian-American physicist and the founder of the theory of poroelasticity
 Karel Bossart (1904–1975), pioneering rocket designer and 'father (creator) of the Atlas ICBM'
 Sylvain Cappell (1946–), Belgian-born mathematician at New York University
 Julius Arthur Nieuwland (1878–1936), Belgian-born Holy Cross priest and professor of chemistry and botany at the University of Notre Dame; known for his contributions to acetylene research and the discovery of synthetic rubber which eventually led to the discovery of Neoprene by DuPont
 Nicolas Ruwet (1932–2001), linguist, literary critic and musical analyst
 Charles Schepens (1912–2006), influential American ophthalmologist, regarded by many in the profession as "the father of modern retinal surgery"
 George Van Biesbroeck (1880–1974), astronomer
 George Washington Goethals (1858–1928), United States army general and civil engineer
 Kevin M. De Cock, Director of the U.S. Centers for Disease Control and Prevention's (CDC) Center for Global Health

Singers 
 Vivica Genaux, mezzo-soprano; her Belgian-born father was a biochemistry professor at the University of Alaska
 Brian Molko, lead singer of Placebo; born in Brussels.
 Corey Taylor, lead singer of Slipknot and Stone Sour; of Belgian background from his father's side
 Sharon Van Etten (1981–), singer-songwriter

Sports 
 Alice Sue Claeys (1975–), figure skater
 Edgard Colle (1897–1932), Belgian-born chess master; pioneered the chess opening termed the Colle System
 Dave DeBusschere (1940–2003), basketball player
 Roger DeCoster (1944–), legendary Belgian-born motocross racer. His name is almost synonymous with the sport of motocross. He won five 500cc Motocross World Championships and tallied a record 36 500cc Grand Prix victories. He was inducted into the Motorsports Hall of Fame of America in 1994, becoming only the seventh motorcyclist in the Hall. In 1999, he was inducted into the AMA Motorcycle Hall of Fame.
 Jacob deGrom (1988–), baseball player
 Arthur Duray (1882–1954), racing driver
 Art Houtteman (1927–2003), baseball player
 George Koltanowski (1903–2000), Belgian-born chess player and promoter
 Earl Louis "Curly" Lambeau (1898–1965), founder, player, and the first coach of the Green Bay Packers professional football team; Lambeau Field in Green Bay, Wisconsin is named after him
 Tuffy Leemans (1912–1979), football player and coach
 Dutch Leonard (1909–1983), baseball player
 Ryan Spilborghs (1979–), baseball player
 Tim Tebow (1987–), baseball player, former football player
 John Vanbiesbrouck (1963–), ice hockey goaltender
 Christian Vande Velde (1976–), professional road cyclist, whose grandfather immigrated from Ghent in Flanders
 Kiki Vandeweghe (1958–), basketball player

Writers 
 Robert Goffin (1898–1984)
 Kate Bolduan (1983–), journalist
 May Sarton (1912–1995), Belgian-born American poet, novelist, and memoirist; daughter of George Sarton; many of her novels and poems are pellucid reflections of the lesbian experience
 Katrina vanden Heuvel (1959–), editor and publisher
 Michele Wucker (1969–), author
 Marguerite Yourcenar (1903–1987), Belgian-born novelist
 Patricia Ziegfeld Stephenson (1916–2008), author; father of partial Belgian descent
 Lucy Sante (1954–), author

Other 
 Paul Vandervoort (1846–1902), Union army soldier
 Cyriel Barbary (1899–2004), last surviving Belgian veteran of the First World War

External links 
 Genealogical Society for Belgian Immigrants (USA)
 The Belgian-American Research Collection
 Flemish-American heroes
 Belgians in the Civil War - 1840–1865
 The Belgian-American Club of Chicago
 Famous Belgian Americans
 Peninsula Belgian American Club
 The Calverts and Stiers of Riversdale
 Belgian-American Association of Detroit

References 

Belgian Americans

Americans
Belgian